The 1880 United States presidential election in South Carolina took place on November 2, 1880, as part of the 1880 United States presidential election. Voters chose 7 representatives, or electors to the Electoral College, who voted for president and vice president.

South Carolina voted for the Democratic nominee, Winfield Scott Hancock, over the Republican nominee, James A. Garfield. Hancock won the state by a margin of 31.38%.

Results

References

South Carolina
1880
1880 South Carolina elections